Margaret Jean Jennings (born 1 June 1949) is a former Australian international cricketer. A right-handed batswoman and wicket-keeper, she played 8 Tests for Australia, scoring 341 runs with a best of 104, her only century. She also captained the her country in one Test match against India in 1977. She made her Test debut against New Zealand in 1972, and her last came against India in 1977. Jennings was the first woman cricketer to have kept wicket and to have opened the batting as captain in the history of WODI. She is also the only woman to do this in Test cricket.

Jennings was born in Essendon, a suburb of Melbourne, Victoria. After retiring from playing, she was a selector for the Australian women's team for a number of years. She stepped down from the position in February 2013.

See also
List of Australia national cricket captains

References

Further reading

External links
 
 

1949 births
Living people
Australia women Test cricketers
Australia women One Day International cricketers
Cricketers from Melbourne
Victoria women cricketers
Sportswomen from Victoria (Australia)
Wicket-keepers
People from Essendon, Victoria